Adolph Nehrkorn (29 December 1841, in Riddagshausen, today part of Braunschweig – 8 April 1916, in Braunschweig) was a German ornithologist and collector of bird eggs.

Adolph's father worked at the Abbey in Riddagshausen. His early schooling was at Collegium Carolinum in Braunschweig. After working for some years as a farmer, he went to study at the University of Berlin. In 1866 he married Ellen Streichenberg. He took a great interest in birds, collecting their eggs. His large collection of eggs was bequeathed to the Berlin Zoological Museum (which in the present day is the Berlin's Natural History Museum).

The crimson-crowned flowerpecker (Dicaeum nehrkorni) and the Sangihe white-eye  (Zosterops nehrkorni) are two avian species named in his honor.

References

External links

Katalog der Eiersammlung, nebst Beschreibungeh der aussereuropchen Eier. by Adolph Nehrkorn 1910

German ornithologists
Egg collectors
1841 births
1916 deaths
Scientists from Braunschweig
People from the Duchy of Brunswick
Oologists